This article is about the significance of the year 1776 to Wales and its people.

Incumbents
Lord Lieutenant of Anglesey - Sir Nicholas Bayly, 2nd Baronet
Lord Lieutenant of Brecknockshire and Monmouthshire – Charles Morgan of Dderw
Lord Lieutenant of Caernarvonshire - Thomas Wynn
Lord Lieutenant of Cardiganshire – Wilmot Vaughan, 1st Earl of Lisburne
Lord Lieutenant of Carmarthenshire – George Rice
Lord Lieutenant of Denbighshire - Richard Myddelton  
Lord Lieutenant of Flintshire - Sir Roger Mostyn, 5th Baronet 
Lord Lieutenant of Glamorgan – John Stuart, Lord Mountstuart
Lord Lieutenant of Merionethshire - Sir Watkin Williams-Wynn, 4th Baronet (from 10 June)
Lord Lieutenant of Montgomeryshire – Francis Seymour-Conway, 1st Marquess of Hertford (until 21 November); George Herbert, 2nd Earl of Powis (from 21 November)
Lord Lieutenant of Pembrokeshire – Sir Hugh Owen, 5th Baronet
Lord Lieutenant of Radnorshire – Edward Harley, 4th Earl of Oxford and Earl Mortimer

Bishop of Bangor – John Moore
Bishop of Llandaff – Shute Barrington
Bishop of St Asaph – Jonathan Shipley
Bishop of St Davids – James Yorke

Events
4 July – United States Declaration of Independence signed in Philadelphia. Sixteen of the 56 signatories are of Welsh descent, Francis Lewis having been born in Llandaff. 
22 July – Sir Richard Philipps, 7th Baronet, is created 1st Baron Milford in the peerage of Ireland.
24 August – Herbert Mackworth is created a baronet.
dates unknown  
John, Lord Mountstuart is created Baron Cardiff of Cardiff Castle.
Sir Thomas Wynn, 3rd Baronet, is created Baron Newborough in the Peerage of Ireland.

Arts and literature

New books
Thomas Churchyard – The Worthines of Wales, a Poem
Evan Evans (Ieuan Fardd) – Casgliad o Bregethau
Hugh Jones (Maesglasau) – Gardd y Caniadau
David Powell (Dewi Nantbrân) –

Music
Aaron Williams - Collection of hymn-tunes

Births
18 February – John Parry, composer (d. 1851)
April (baptized 21 April) – Ann Griffiths, hymn-writer (d. 1805)
2 August – Thomas Assheton Smith II, landowner, industrialist, politician, and sportsman (d. 1858)
20 October – Sir Thomas Mostyn, 6th Baronet, politician (d. 1831) 
dates unknown 
John Bryan (died 1856)
William Henry Scourfield, Member of Parliament (d. 1843)

Deaths
26 January – Evan Lloyd, poet, 41
6 April – Hugh Hughes ("Y Bardd Coch"), poet, 83 
4 July – Sir John Powell Pryce, 6th Baronet (in debtors' prison)
6 September – Joshua Parry, Nonconformist minister and writer, 67
1 November – Miles Harry, Baptist minister, 76
December – John Edwards ("Sion y Potiau"), poet, 76/77
10 December – Robert Hay Drummond, Bishop of St Asaph 1748–1761, 65
dates unknown 
William Evans, lexicographer, age unknown
Aaron Williams, composer, about 45

References

Wales
Wales